The Bramertonian Stage is the name for an early Pleistocene  biostratigraphic stage in the British Isles. It precedes the Pre-Pastonian Stage (Baventian Stage). It derives its name from Bramerton Pits in Norfolk, where the deposits can be found on the surface. The exact timing of the beginning and end of the Bramertonian Stage is currently unknown. It is only known that it is equivalent to the Tiglian C1-4b Stage of Europe and early Pre-Illinoian Stage of North America. It lies somewhere in time between Marine Oxygen Isotope stages 65 to 95 and somewhere between 1.816 and 2.427 Ma (million years ago). The Bramertonian is correlated with the Antian stage identified from pollen assemblages in the Ludham borehole.

During this stage, the climate was temperate with evidence for mixed oak forest in southern England and the arrival of hemlock. Evidence from East Anglia suggests sea levels were higher than they are today.

See also
Ice age
Glacial period
Last glacial period
Timeline of glaciation

References

Further reading
Bowen, D.Q., 1978, Quaternary geology: a stratigraphic framework for multidisciplinary work.  Pergamon Press, Oxford, United Kingdom. 221 pp. 
Ehlers, J., P. L. Gibbard, and J. Rose, eds., 1991, Glacial deposits in Great Britain and Ireland. Balkema, Rotterdam. 580 pp 
Mangerud, J., J. Ehlers, and P. Gibbard, 2004, Quaternary Glaciations: Extent and Chronology 1: Part I Europe, Elsevier, Amsterdam.  
Sibrava, V., Bowen, D.Q, and Richmond, G.M., 1986, Quaternary Glaciations in the Northern Hemisphere, Quaternary Science Reviews, vol. 5, pp. 1–514.

External links
anonymous, 2007a, Global correlation tables for the Quaternary. Subcommission on Quaternary Stratigraphy, Department of Geography, University of Cambridge, Cambridge, England.

Glaciology
Pleistocene
Interglacials